Restaurant Empire II is the sequel to Restaurant Empire. It has new features such as new themes for American restaurants, over 700 pieces of new internal and external furniture and decorations, the addition of German cuisine and the city of Munich, and several others. The game has also been ported to Mac OS X by Virtual Programming, Ltd.

Gameplay

The player controls the kind of cuisine the restaurant serves (American, French, Italian, German). Along with Munich, other cities include Los Angeles, Paris, and Rome.

As a new feature, the player can also own various kinds of restaurants, including a coffee shop and a dessert house. In the campaign mode, many new features have been added, such as organizing performance in your restaurant and changing the colors of the uniforms on your staff. Returning characters are Armand and Michel LeBoeuf, Delia Delecoeur, and Don Corleone. The campaign mode features a remade version of the campaign in the original Restaurant Empire. The game also focuses more on the managerial aspects of running a restaurant empire.

Critical reception

Reviews have been mixed, with praise for adding new content and keeping the game alive, but complaints about micromanagement and the recycled graphics.

Metacritic rates it as "Mixed or average reviews."

References

External links
Official website

2009 video games
Business simulation games
Fictional chefs
Fictional French people
Restaurants in fiction
macOS games
Video game sequels
Video games about food and drink
Video games developed in China
Windows games
Paradox Interactive games
Single-player video games